Blåsen nu alla, "All blow now!", is one of the Swedish poet and performer Carl Michael Bellman's best-known and best-loved songs, from his 1790 collection, Fredman's Epistles, where it is No. 25. It is a pastorale, based on François Boucher's rococo 1740 painting Triumph of Venus.

The epistle is subtitled "Som är ett försök till en pastoral i bacchanalisk smak, skriven vid Ulla Winblads överfart till Djurgården" (Which is an attempt at a pastorale in Bacchanalian taste, written on Ulla Winblad's crossing to Djurgården)

Context

Song

Music and verse form 

Blåsen nu alla is a song in eight verses, each of 15 short lines. The rhyming pattern is AABAB-CCDCD-EEEFF. It is in  time and is marked Menuetto (Minuet). The melody has the timbre "Waldthorns-stycke" but is origin beyond that is unknown; the song was most likely written in the first half of 1770.

Lyrics 

The song, which Bellman called "his Epistle", begins with a rococo theme, with the classical goddess Venus crossing the water, as in François Boucher's Triumph of Venus, but the waterway is Stockholm's harbour, and when the goddess disembarks, Bellman transforms her into a lustful Ulla Winblad. In his time, the painting hung in Drottningholm Palace.

The Epistle was planned as the grand finale to Bellman's planned initial collection of 25 Epistles, the grandiose assembly of figures from classical mythology contrasting with the reality of a boat crossing.

Reception

The scholar of literature Lars Lönnroth writes that Bellman transformed song genres including elegy and pastorales into social reportage, and that he achieved this also in his two Bacchanalian lake-journeys, epistles 25 and 48 ("Solen glimmar blank och trind"). The two are, he notes, extremely unlike in style, in narrative technique, and in Fredman's role in the description. Whereas epistle 25 portrays Ulla Winblad as the goddess Venus, and speaks of Neptune's court with classical mythological appurtenances like zephyrs, water-nymphs, and "all the might of Paphos" (the birthplace of Venus), epistle 48 is naturalistic.

The song has been recorded by Sven-Bertil Taube and Mikael Samuelsson (Sjunger Fredmans Epistlar, Polydor, 1990) among others.

References

Sources

 
 
  (contains the most popular Epistles and Songs, in Swedish, with sheet music)
 
  (with facsimiles of sheet music from first editions in 1790, 1791)

External links 

 Text of Epistle 25

1790 compositions
Swedish songs
Fredmans epistlar